A via (Latin for path or way) is an electrical connection between copper layers in a printed circuit board. Essentially a via is a small drilled hole that goes through two or more adjacent layers; the hole is plated with copper that forms electrical connection through the insulation that separates the copper layers.

Vias are important for PCB manufacturing. This is because the vias are drilled with certain tolerances and may be fabricated off their designated locations, so some allowance for errors in drill position must be made prior to manufacturing or else the manufacturing yield can decrease due to non-conforming boards (according to some reference standard) or even due to failing boards. In addition, regular through hole vias are considered fragile structures as they are long and narrow; the manufacturer must ensure that the vias are plated properly throughout the barrel and this in turn causes several processing steps.

In printed circuit boards 

In printed circuit board (PCB) design, a via consists of two pads in corresponding positions on different copper layers of the board, that are electrically connected by a hole through the board. The hole is made conductive by electroplating, or is lined with a tube or a rivet. High-density multilayer PCBs may have microvias: blind vias are exposed only on one side of the board, while buried vias connect internal layers without being exposed on either surface. Thermal vias carry heat away from power devices and are typically used in arrays of about a dozen.

A via consists of:
 Barrel — conductive tube filling the drilled hole
 Pad — connects each end of the barrel to the component, plane, or trace
 Antipad — clearance hole between barrel and metal layer to which it is not connected

A via, sometimes called PTV or plated-through-via, should not be confused with a plated through hole (PTH). Via is used as an interconnection between copper layers on a PCB while the PTH is generally made larger than vias and is used as a plated hole for acceptance of component leads - such as non-SMT resistors, capacitors, and DIP package IC. PTH can also be used as holes for mechanical connection while vias may not. Another usage of PTH is known as a castellated hole where the PTH is aligned at the edge of the board so that it is cut in half when the board is milled out of the panel - the main usage is for allowing one PCB to be soldered to another in a stack - thus acting both as a fastener and also as a connector.

Three major kinds of vias are shown in right figure. The basic steps of making a PCB are: making the substrate material and stacking it in layers; through-drilling of plating the vias; and copper trace patterning using photolithography and etching. With this standard procedure, possible via configurations are limited to through-holes. Depth-controlled drilling techniques such as using lasers can allow for more varied via types. (Laser drills can also be used for smaller and more precisely positioned holes than mechanical drills produce.) PCB manufacturing typically starts with a so-called core, a basic double-sided PCB. Layers beyond the first two are stacked from this basic building block. If two more layers are consecutively stacked from bottom of core, you can have a 1-2 via, a 1-3 via and a through hole. Each type of via is made by drilling at each stacking stage. If one layer is stacked on top of the core and other is stacked from the bottom, the possible via configurations are 1-3, 2-3 and through hole. The user must gather information about the PCB manufacturer's allowed methods of stacking and possible vias. For cheaper boards, only through holes are made and antipad (or clearance) is placed on layers which are supposed not to be contacted to vias.

IPC 4761 
IPC 4761 defines the following via types:

 Type I: Tented via
 Type II: Tented & covered via
 Type III-a: Plugged via, sealed with non-conductive material on one side
 Type III-b: Plugged via, sealed with non-conductive material on both sides
 Type IV-a: Plugged & covered via, sealed with non-conductive material and covered with wet solder mask on one side 
 Type IV-b: Plugged & covered via, sealed with non-conductive material and covered with wet solder mask on both sides
 Type V: Filled via, filled with non-conductive paste
 Type VI-a: Filled & covered via, covered with dry film or wet solder mask on one side
 Type VI-b: Filled & covered via, covered with dry film or wet solder mask on both sides
 Type VII: Filled & capped via, filled with non-conductive paste and overplated on both sides

Failure behavior 
If well made, PCB vias will primarily fail due to differential expansion and contraction between the copper plating and the PCB in the out of plane direction (Z). This differential expansion and contraction will induce cyclic fatigue in the copper plating, eventually resulting in crack propagation and an electrical open circuit. Various design, material, and environmental parameters will influence the rate of this degradation. To ensure via robustness, IPC sponsored a round-robin exercise that developed a time to failure calculator.

Vias in integrated circuits 

In integrated circuit (IC) design, a via is a small opening in an insulating oxide layer that allows a conductive connection between different layers. A via on an integrated circuit that passes completely through a silicon wafer or die is called a through-chip via or through-silicon via (TSV). Through-glass vias (TGV) have been studied by Corning Glass for semiconductor packaging, due to the reduced electrical loss of glass versus silicon packaging. A via connecting the lowest layer of metal to diffusion or poly is typically called a "contact".

Gallery

See also

 Through-hole technology (THT)
 Surface-mount technology (SMT)
 Through-silicon via (TSV)
 Via fence
 Feedthrough

Notes

References

Further reading

External links
 Online Via Calculator (Ampacity, Capacitance, Impedance, Power Dissipation Calculation).

Electronic design
Electronics manufacturing
Printed circuit board manufacturing